All The Best: Fun Begins is a 2009 Indian Hindi-language comedy film directed by Rohit Shetty and produced by Ajay Devgn. It stars Ajay Devgn, Sanjay Dutt, Fardeen Khan, Bipasha Basu, Johny Lever, Sanjay Mishra and Mugdha Godse. Upon release, it was a critical and commercial success.

The plot is based on Marathi comedy play Pati Sagle Uchapati which itself is based on the English comedy play Right Bed Wrong Husband. The English play has been an inspiration for Tamil films- Veettuku Veedu and Vishwanathan Ramamoorthy as well as Kannada films- Galate Samsara and Housefull.

The film was subsequently remade with slight changes in the story in Malayalam in 2010 as Best of Luck  which went on to be remade in Kannada in 2015 as Ond Chance Kodi.

Plot
Veer Kapoor (Fardeen Khan) is a struggling artist who hopes to make it big someday with his rock group but at present is tottering financially. His only source of income is a monthly pocket money of Rs 100,000 from his wealthy elder step brother Dharam Kapoor (Sanjay Dutt), for which Veer has told a lie about him being married to Vidya (Mugdha Godse), his girlfriend. His best friend is Prem Chopra (Ajay Devgn), who is married to Jhanvi Chopra (Bipasha Basu). Jhanvi runs a broken down gymnasium owned by Prem's family and Prem spends his time mechanically modifying cars.

Veer and Prem need Rs. 500,000 to register Prem's car for an illegal race (if they win they will get Rs. 5,000,000). They borrow the money from a local mute loan shark Tobu (Johnny Lever) after showing him a car designed by Prem which, Prem assures him, cannot lose. Impressed by this vehicle, Tobu in addition to lending Prem and Veer 500,000, invest 500,000 of his own on Prem. Prem loses the race and ends up owing a sum of Rs.  to Tobu which should be paid within a week.

Prem decides to rent out Veer's bungalow to a local slum dweller RGV;— Raghuvandas Goverdhandas Vakawale (Sanjay Mishra), who has won a lottery, and collects an advance of Rs 250,000. However, everything gets into a muddle when Dharam is stranded in the Goa Airport on his way to Lushoto and insists on catching up with his younger brother. Things get worse when their new tenant arrives and is beaten by Dharam. In order to save the situation, Prem and Veer both lie that Raghu is mad and vice versa.

Vidya had a fight with Veer and is temporarily not talking to him. After Veer brings Dharam home from the airport, Dharam sees Jhanvi and takes her for Vidya, and later when he sees Vidya, Prem and Veer tell him she is Jhanvi, Prem's girlfriend. Jhanvi pretends to be Vidya, Veer's wife and Vidya pretends to be Jhanvi. Both the young men aren't happy as Veer's brother's flight to Lushoto got delayed by a few days. Dharam decides to stay with his brother until further notice.

Prem sees Dharam's watch, a Rolex and decides to finish their debt to Tobu by giving him the Rolex. Dharam occasionally flirts with Jhanvi(Vidya) which irks Prem. in a similar way, Prem pays off the debt now by giving Tobu the royal gift of the king that turns out to be pickle for the princess. Immediately after Prem comes back home, A frantic jhanvi becomes unconscious and is rushed to the hospital by Prem, this is seen by Dharam and he follows them to the hospital and slaps Prem for taking jhanvi, the doctor informs Prem that Jhanvi is pregnant.

Veer feels extremely guilty now because his brother thinks that Vidya and him are having a baby, veer decides that he will tell Dharam the truth but before that Dharam reveals that his flight to lushoto has been booked. before Dharam leaves, Tobu and his men barge in the house and Dharam finds out the truth. The house is soon surrounded by thugs from lushoto, who turn out to be the king's men. it is later revealed that Dharam and the princess had an affair and that the princess is pregnant. The king's men want Dharam and the princess to get married. they accept and its a happy ending.

Cast
 Sanjay Dutt as Dharam Kapoor
 Ajay Devgan as Prem Chopra
 Fardeen Khan as Veer Kapoor
 Bipasha Basu in a double role as
 Jhanvi Chopra / fake Vidya
 Gutoto, Princess of Lushoto
 Mugdha Godse as Vidya / fake Jhanvi
 Ashwini Kalsekar as Mary, a Malayali maid
 Sanjay Mishra as Raghunandandas Govardhandas Vakawale a.k.a. "R.G.V."
 Johnny Lever as Tobu
 Vijay Patkar as Goli
 Mukesh Tiwari as Chautala, Dharam's secretary
 Asrani as Vidya's father
 Atul Parchure as Dhondu
 Shraddha Musale as Betty (keyboard player on Veer's band)
 Puneet Vashisht as Chris

Awards

|-
| rowspan="3"|2010
| Sanjay Dutt
| IIFA Award for Best Performance in a Comic Role
| 
|-
| Ajay Devgn
| Stardust Award for Best Actor in a Comedy or Romance
| 
|-
| Ajay Devgn
| Apsara Award Best Actor in a Comic Role
| 
|}

Release and Reception
The movie was released in Diwali just like Golmaal series. The film received mostly positive reviews from critics.

Box office
The film had opened to an average start as it released with two other diwali releases that year but had later picked up due to positive word of mouth . It was rated as "Average" in India, and is the eighth highest grossing Bollywood film of 2009.

Soundtrack

Released by T-Series, the soundtrack was composed by Pritam and the lyrics were penned by Kumaar.

Track listing

References

External links
 

Ajay Devgn
2009 films
2000s Hindi-language films
Indian action comedy films
Films directed by Rohit Shetty
Films featuring songs by Pritam
2009 action comedy films
Indian films based on plays
Films scored by Sanjoy Chowdhury
Hindi films remade in other languages
Films distributed by Yash Raj Films
2009 comedy films
Hindi-language comedy films